Rin Nitaya (born August 8, 1997) is a Japanese figure skater. She is the 2017 Winter Universiade silver medalist, 2015 Gardena Spring Trophy champion, and 2016 Coupe du Printemps silver medalist.

Personal life
Rin Nitaya was born in Nishinomiya, Hyōgo Prefecture, Japan.

Career
Nitaya debuted in international competitions in 2013 at the Gardena Spring Trophy, winning silver in the junior ladies category.

2014–15 season
In the 2014–15 season, Nitaya debuted on the ISU Junior Grand Prix (JGP) circuit, winning silver in Courchevel, France. She placed fourth at her second JGP assignment, in Tallinn, Estonia. Concluding her season, she won her first senior international medal – gold at the Gardena Spring Trophy.

2015–16 season
Competing in the 2015–16 JGP series, Nitaya finished fourth in Bratislava, Slovakia and won the bronze medal in Toruń, Poland. In November, she placed 4th at the 2015–16 Japanese Junior Championships.

Nitaya won the senior silver medal at the 2016 Coupe du Printemps.

2016–17 season
In February 2017, Nitaya received the silver medal at the 2017 Winter Universiade in Almaty, Kazakhstan. She ranked third in the short program and second in the free skate, finishing second to Elena Radionova.

Programs

Competitive highlights 
CS: Challenger Series; JGP: Junior Grand Prix

References

External links 
 

1997 births
Sportspeople from Hyōgo Prefecture
Japanese female single skaters
Universiade medalists in figure skating
Living people
Universiade silver medalists for Japan
Competitors at the 2017 Winter Universiade